Hòa Bình (also written as , lit. "peace") may refer to:

Places in Vietnam
Hòa Bình Province, a province in the Northwest region
Hòa Bình City, capital of Hòa Bình Province
Hòa Bình District, a rural district of Bạc Liêu Province
Hòa Bình, Biên Hòa, a ward of Biên Hòa, Dong Nai province.
Hòa Bình, Gia Lai, a ward of Ayun Pa
Hòa Bình, Bạc Liêu, a township and capital of Hòa Bình District
Hòa Bình, Nghệ An, a township and capital of Tương Dương District
Hòa Bình, Hanoi, a commune of Thường Tín District
Hòa Bình, Thủy Nguyên, a commune of Thủy Nguyên District in Haiphong
Hòa Bình, Vĩnh Bảo, a commune of Vĩnh Bảo District in Haiphong
Hòa Bình, Hòa Bình City, a commune of Hòa Bình City
Hòa Bình, Kon Tum, a commune of Kon Tum
Hòa Bình, An Giang, a commune of Chợ Mới District, An Giang Province
Hòa Bình, Bà Rịa–Vũng Tàu, a commune of Xuyên Mộc District
Hòa Bình, Đồng Tháp, a commune of Tam Nông District, Đồng Tháp Province
Hòa Bình, Bình Gia, a commune of Bình Gia District in Lạng Sơn Province
Hòa Bình, Chi Lăng, a commune of Chi Lăng District in Lạng Sơn Province
Hòa Bình, Hữu Lũng, a commune of Hữu Lũng District in Lạng Sơn Province
Hòa Bình, Văn Quan, a commune of Văn Quan District in Lạng Sơn Province
Hòa Bình, Quảng Ninh, a commune of Hoành Bồ District
Hòa Bình, Hưng Hà, a commune of Hưng Hà District in Thái Bình Province
Hòa Bình, Kiến Xương, a commune of Kiến Xương District in Thái Bình Province
Hòa Bình, Vũ Thư, a commune of Vũ Thư District in Thái Bình Province
Hòa Bình, Thái Nguyên, a commune of Đồng Hỷ District
Hòa Bình, Vĩnh Long, a commune of Trà Ôn District

Other uses
Hòa Bình 1, a commune of Tây Hòa District
Hòa Bình Thạnh, a commune of Châu Thành District, An Giang Province
Hòa Bình Dam, the second largest hydroelectric dam in Vietnam
Hoa-Binh (film), a 1970 French film
Hoabinhian, prehistoric cultures in Southeast Asia characterized by flaked stone and cobble artifacts

See also 
 Heping (disambiguation), the Chinese cognate